The Heard Island shag (Leucocarbo nivalis), or Heard Island cormorant, is a marine cormorant native to the Australian territory comprising the Heard and McDonald Islands in the Southern Ocean, about 4100 km south-west of Perth, Western Australia.

Taxonomy
The Heard Island shag is one of the blue-eyed shags, sometimes placed in the genus Leucocarbo, and a subspecies of the imperial shag. Others place it in the genus Phalacrocorax. It is now usually considered to be a full species.

Distribution and habitat
The Heard Island shag is restricted to the subantarctic Heard and McDonald Islands, and is only known to breed on Heard Island. Apart from breeding and roosting, its habitat is marine.

Description
The Heard Island shag has largely black upperparts and white underparts. The cheeks and ear-coverts are white; there are white bars on the wings, a black, recurved crest over the forehead, and pink feet. A breeding adult has a pair of orange caruncles above the base of the bill in front of the eyes as well as blue eye-rings. It is about 77 cm in length, with a wingspan of 120 cm and a weight of 3 kg.

Behaviour
Heard Island shags are gregarious, roosting in groups of from 10-20 birds up to several hundred.

Breeding
The birds are present year round at Heard Island, where they breed annually in colonies. Courtship takes place from late August to early October. Nests are mounds built largely of the stipes, roots and adhering soil of the tussock grass Poa cookii and average about 22 cm high, with a minimum distance between nests of 50 cm. The clutch of two or three eggs is laid mainly between mid-September and November, hatching from November to February. The chicks fledge from January to March.

Feeding
The birds forage locally in shallow coastal waters, with the diet consisting primarily of polychaetes and fish. The proportion of fish in the diet is higher when the birds are feeding chicks.

Status and conservation
The Heard Island shag population is estimated to comprise about 1000 breeding pairs. It is listed as Vulnerable under Australia's Environment Protection and Biodiversity Conservation Act 1999, because the population is small, localised and subject to fluctuations in breeding success due to weather conditions and food availability. A potential threat is climate change affecting sea temperatures and thus food supply.

Notes

References

Heard Island shag
Fauna of Heard Island and McDonald Islands
Heard Island shag
Heard Island shag
Birds of Australia